Transference: A Bipolar Love Story is a 2020 independent drama film directed by, produced and written by and starring Raffaello Degruttola.

Degruttola draws influence from his fraught relationship with his father, who struggled with severe bipolar disorder throughout his life.

Plot 
Katarina, a Norwegian nurse starts a new job in palliative care in a London hospital. When she meets an older male nurse Nik, Katrina initiates a passionate love affair that ultimately suffers the consequences of concealed mental health issues.

Cast 

 Raffaello Degruttola
 Emilie Sofie Johannesen
 Lotte Verbeek
 Simone Lahbib
 Christina Chong
 Ania Sowinski
 Pernille Broch
 Iggy Blanco
 Tyronne Keogh
 Reice Weathers

Production 
Degruttola shot the film "guerilla style" in Finchley, London and in friends' and relatives' homes.

Reception 
The film was released in May 2021 on YouTube, where it went viral, reaching 13 million views by late August 2022.

It was selected for the Arizona and Buenos Aires International Film Festivals. The film also received a Special Jury Mention at the 2020 New York Socially Relevant Film Festival.

On review aggregator website Rotten Tomatoes, the film has an approval rating of 90%, based on 10 reviews.

References

External links 

 
 Transference: A Bipolar Love Story at Rotten Tomatoes

2020s English-language films